A collision is the situation that occurs when two or more demands are made simultaneously on equipment that can handle only one at any given instant. It may refer to:

 Collision domain, a physical network segment where data packets can "collide"
 Carrier-sense multiple access with collision avoidance, (CSMA/CA) used for example with wireless LANs
 Carrier-sense multiple access with collision detection, (CSMA/CD) used with Ethernet
 Late collision, a specific type of collision that should not occur on properly operating networks
 Local collision is a collision that occurs in the network interface rather than on the network itself

See also
 Collision (disambiguation)
 Contention (telecommunications)

References

Telecommunications engineering